Christopher "Chino" Santana (born August 20, 1992) is an American soccer player who last played as a midfielder for Orange County Blues FC in USL Pro.

Career

Youth and college
Santana played four years of college soccer at UC Irvine between 2010 and 2013, where he was named Second Team All-Big West in 2013.

While at college, Santana also appeared for USL PDL clubs Orange County Blue Star in 2012 and OC Blues Strikers in 2013.

Professional
Along with his brother, Jiovanni Santana, Christopher signed with USL Pro club Orange County Blues FC on April 16, 2014.

References

1992 births
Living people
American soccer players
UC Irvine Anteaters men's soccer players
Orange County Blue Star players
OC Pateadores Blues players
Orange County SC players
Association football midfielders
Soccer players from California
USL League Two players
USL Championship players